Temurkhuja "Tima" Abdukholiqov (born 25 September 1991) is an Uzbek professional footballer who plays as a forward for Navbahor Namangan and the Uzbekistan national team.

Career

Pakhtakor Tashkent
Abdukholiqov made his debut for FC Pakhtakor Tashkent in the Uzbek League on 5 March 2011 against Qizilqum Zarafshon in which he started and scored a goal before coming off in the 88th minute as Pakhtakor were winning 2–0. He then scored his second goal for Pakhtakor on 16 March 2011 during the AFC Champions League against Sadd Sports Club.

Hajduk Split
On 10 February 2014 he signed for Hajduk Split after a 1-week trial with the club. He became the first Uzbek player to play in Croatia. He was released in December 2014 after just 10 appearances for the club and just 3 minutes played in the first half of the 14/15 season.

Honours

Club
Pakhtakor Tashkent
 Uzbek League: 2012
 Uzbek Cup: 2011

Lokomotiv Tashkent
 Uzbek League: 2016, 2018
 Uzbek Cup: 2016
 Uzbekistan Super Cup: 2015, 2019

Individual
Uzbek League Top Scorer: 2016 (22 goals)

Career statistics

Club

International goals
Scores and results list Uzbekistan's goal tally first.

References

External links
 

1991 births
Living people
Uzbekistani expatriate footballers
Uzbekistan international footballers
Uzbekistan Super League players
Association football forwards
Uzbekistani footballers
Pakhtakor Tashkent FK players
HNK Hajduk Split players
Croatian Football League players
Expatriate footballers in Croatia
Al-Sailiya SC players
Khor Fakkan Sports Club players
Qatar Stars League players
UAE Pro League players
Expatriate footballers in Qatar
Expatriate footballers in the United Arab Emirates
Uzbekistani expatriate sportspeople in Qatar
Uzbekistani expatriate sportspeople in the United Arab Emirates
Sportspeople from Tashkent